The NASA M2-F1 was a lightweight, unpowered prototype aircraft, developed to flight-test the wingless lifting body concept. Its unusual appearance earned it the nickname "flying bathtub" and was designated the M2-F1, the M referring to "manned", and F referring to "flight" version. In 1962, NASA Dryden management approved a program to build a lightweight, unpowered lifting-body prototype. It featured a plywood shell placed over a tubular steel frame crafted at Dryden. Construction was completed in 1963.

Development
The lifting-body concept originated in the mid-1950s at the National Advisory Committee for Aeronautics' Ames Aeronautical Laboratory, Mountain View, California. By February 1962, a series of possible shapes had been developed, and R. Dale Reed was working to gain support for a research vehicle.

The construction of the M2-F1 was a joint effort by Dryden and a local glider manufacturer, the Briegleb Glider Company. The budget was US$30,000. NASA craftsmen and engineers built the tubular steel interior frame. Its mahogany plywood shell was handmade by Gus Briegleb and company. Ernie Lowder, a NASA craftsman who had worked on Howard Hughes' H-4 Hercules ("Spruce Goose"), was assigned to help Briegleb.

Final assembly of the remaining components (including aluminum tail surfaces, pushrod controls, and landing gear from a Cessna 150, later replaced by Cessna 180 landing gear) was done at the NASA facility.

The wingless, lifting-body aircraft design was initially conceived as a means of landing a spacecraft horizontally after atmospheric reentry. The absence of wings would make the extreme heat of reentry less damaging to the vehicle. Rather than using a ballistic reentry trajectory like a Command Module, very limited in maneuvering range, a lifting-body vehicle had a landing footprint of the size of California.

Tow testing

The first flight tests of the M2-F1 were at Rogers Dry Lake, at the end of a tow rope attached to a 1963 Pontiac Bonneville convertible. On April 5, 1963 test pilot Milt Thompson lifted the M2-F1's nose off the ground for the first time while being towed. The little craft seemed to bounce uncontrollably between the main landing gear wheels, and stopped when he lowered the nose to the ground. He tried again, but each time with the same results. He felt it was a landing gear problem that could have caused the aircraft to roll on its back if he had lifted the main gear off the ground.

After looking at movies of the tests, it was decided that the bouncing was probably caused by unwanted rudder movements. The control system was modified so that the joystick controlled the elevons rather than the rudder, which solved the problem. 

It was found that the car used to tow the aircraft was not powerful enough to lift the M2-F1 entirely off the ground, so the FRC arranged to have the tow car hot-rodded by Bill Straub: the modifications tuned the engine for increased power, added a rollbar, and turned the front passenger seat to face aft so the passenger could observe the aircraft. This proved successful, and tow tests continued.

That was the most that could be expected during an auto tow.

These initial tests produced enough flight data about the M2-F1 to proceed with flights behind a U.S. Navy C-47 tow plane at greater altitudes.

Flight testing
A NASA C-47 was used for all of the air tows. The first was on August 16, 1963. The M2-F1 had recently been equipped with an ejection seat and small rockets – referred to by the test team as "instant L/D" – in the tail to extend the landing flare for about 5 seconds if needed, and Thompson prepared for the flight with a few more tows behind the Pontiac.

Forward visibility in the M2-F1 was very limited on tow, requiring Thompson to fly about  higher than the C-47, so he could see the plane through the nose window.

Pilot for the first series of flights of the M2-F1 was NASA research pilot Milt Thompson.

The lifting body descended at an average rate of about 3,600 feet per minute (1,100 m/min). The landing was smooth, and the lifting-body program was on its way.

The M2-F1 was flown until August 16, 1966. It proved the lifting-body concept and led the way for subsequent metal "heavyweight" designs. Chuck Yeager, Bruce Peterson and Donald L. Mallick also flew the M2-F1.

More than 400 ground tows and 77 aircraft tow flights were carried out with the M2-F1. The success of Dryden's M2-F1 program led to NASA's development and construction of two heavyweight lifting bodies based on studies at NASA's Ames and Langley research centers – the Northrop M2-F2 and the Northrop HL-10, both built by the Northrop Corporation, and the U.S. Air Force's X-24 program. The lifting-body program also heavily influenced the Space Shuttle program.

The M2-F1 program demonstrated the feasibility of the lifting-body concept for horizontal landings of atmospheric entry vehicles. It also demonstrated a procurement and management concept for prototype flight research vehicles that produced rapid results at very low cost (approximately US$50,000, excluding salaries of government employees assigned to the project).

Pilots
 Milt Thompson – 45 flights
 Bruce Peterson – 17 flights
 Chuck Yeager – 5 flights
 Donald M. Sorlie – 5 flights
 Donald L. Mallick – 2 flights
 Jerauld R. Gentry – 2 flights
 Bill Dana – 1 flight
 James W. Wood – 1 ground tow
 Fred Haise – 1 ground tow
 Joe Engle – 1 ground tow

Aircraft serial number
 NASA M2-F1 – N86652, 77 flights, 400 ground tows

Aircraft on display
As of January 23, 2015, M2-F1 N86652 is on display at the Air Force Flight Test Museum on Edwards Air Force Base, California.

Specifications

Flights

See also

References

 NASA Dryden M2-F1 Photo Collection

Lifting bodies
M2-F1, NASA
NASA M2-F1 Lifting Body
NASA aircraft
Aircraft manufactured in the United States
Aircraft first flown in 1963